The Palermo fragment, also known as Fagan slab from the name of the artist and British consul Robert Fagan who owned it, is a 2,500-year-old marble sculpture fragment of the foot and dress of the ancient Greek goddess Artemis.

The Palermo fragment was taken by Lord Elgin from the Parthenon in the early 19th century and given to the British Consul to Sicily in 1816. For the past two centuries, the fragment had been kept at the Salinas Archaeological Museum in Palermo.  Greece's 13-year campaign for the return of the fragment ended on 24 September 2008, when Italian President Giorgio Napolitano delivered the fragment to Athens on a temporary loan. This move was anticipated to strengthen Greece's request for the British Museum to return the Elgin Marbles.
In 2022, the fragment was loaned again to the Acropolis Museum and reunited with the rest of the Parthenon frieze. The fragment is again on a temporary loan of four years, with an option for another four, but the intention of the Sicilian authorities is to keep extending the loan indefinitely.

References

Ancient Greek sculpture
Art and cultural repatriation
Friezes
Parthenon
Sculptures of Artemis
Thomas Bruce, 7th Earl of Elgin